Robert Corish (born 13 September 1958), also known as Bobby Corish, is an English former professional footballer who played as a full back. Born in Liverpool, he played in the Football League for Derby County and in the North American Soccer League for the Fort Lauderdale Strikers.

After a knee injury ended his football career, he became a physician.

References

Living people
1958 births
Footballers from Liverpool
English footballers
English expatriate footballers
Association football fullbacks
Derby County F.C. players
Fort Lauderdale Strikers (1977–1983) players
English Football League players
North American Soccer League (1968–1984) players
English expatriate sportspeople in the United States
Expatriate soccer players in the United States